Denis Sampson is an acclaimed Irish writer and literary critic who was born in Whitegate, County Clare in Ireland in 1948 and now lives in Montreal, Canada. In 2015 he wrote a memoir, A Migrant Life, about his rural Irish childhood and his passion for books. He is review editor for the Canadian Journal of Irish Studies and an English teacher at Vanier College, Montreal.

His published works include studies of the works of John McGahern and of Brian Moore.

Sampson is a cousin of Irish novelist Edna O'Brien.

Works
The Found Voice: Writers' Beginnings (2016), 192pp. Oxford University Press, 
A Migrant Heart (2014), 238pp. Montreal: Linda Leith Publishing
Young John McGahern: Becoming a Novelist (2012), 196pp. Oxford University Press, 
Brian Moore: The Chameleon Novelist (1998), 344pp. Dublin: Marino Books
Outstaring Nature's Eye: The Fiction of John McGahern (1993), 263pp. The Catholic University of America Press,

References

External links
 Official website
 Contributions to The Dublin Review
 Contributions to Dublin Review of Books

Living people
20th-century Canadian male writers
20th-century Irish male writers
21st-century Canadian male writers
21st-century Irish writers
21st-century Irish male writers
People from County Clare
Year of birth missing (living people)